Nora Bonifacino de Somoza (8 August 1930 — 17 January 2013) was an Argentine tennis player.

Biography
Somoza, nicknamed "Norita", grew up in Coronel Suárez, Buenos Aires Province.

An Argentine number one, Somoza was active on tour in the 1950s and 1960s. She was a three-time winner of the Río de la Plata tournament and represented her country at the 1959 Pan American Games in Chicago.

In 1961 she reached the singles third rounds of both the French Championships and Wimbledon. She also teamed up with Reino Nyyssönen at Wimbledon to make the mixed doubles quarter-finals.

Somoza appeared for the Argentina Federation Cup team in a 1965 tie against New Zealand in Melbourne.

See also
List of Argentina Fed Cup team representatives

References

External links
 
 

1930 births
2013 deaths
Argentine female tennis players
Tennis players at the 1959 Pan American Games
Pan American Games competitors for Argentina
Sportspeople from Buenos Aires Province
People from Coronel Suárez Partido